Interstate 195 (I-195) is an auxiliary Interstate Highway running a combined  in the US states of Rhode Island and Massachusetts. It travels from a junction with I-95 in Providence, Rhode Island, east to a junction with I-495 and Massachusetts Route 25 in Wareham, Massachusetts. It runs east–west and passes through the cities of Fall River, Massachusetts, and New Bedford, Massachusetts. The portion of I-195 in East Providence is also known as the East Providence Expressway.

I-195 provides a direct highway route to Cape Cod from Rhode Island and, via I-95, from New York and Connecticut as well.

Route description

|-
|
|
|-
|
|
|-
|Total
|
|}

Rhode Island
I-195 begins at I-95 at a semi-directional T interchange, which along with a new bridge over the Providence River, was part of the large Iway construction project. At this point, US Route 6 (US 6) is also signed along I-195. The complex Iway interchange includes several ramps for local streets (labeled exits 1A and 1B) and an interchange with I-95, which is unnumbered. US 44 and US 1A join at the next interchange with Gano and Main streets, labeled exits 1C, 1D, and 1E. The road crosses the Washington Bridge over the Seekonk River into East Providence. US 44 leaves the freeway at exit 1C in East Providence. Exit 1D is a partial interchange with Route 103 while exit 2A provides access to several local streets in East Providence. Exits 2B and 2C provide access to Route 114, which is also where US 6 and US 1A leave the freeway. I-195 then leaves Rhode Island, having gone .

Massachusetts
I-195 enters Seekonk, Massachusetts, and interchanges with Route 114A at exit 1. There are two interchanges in Swansea, exit 5 for Route 136 and exit 8 for US 6. Access to the town of Somerset and the village of Ocean Grove in Swansea is via exit 10 (Route 103). I-195 crosses the Charles M. Braga Jr. Memorial Bridge over the Taunton River, entering Fall River. Exits 12 and 13 provide access to downtown Fall River streets, while a brief concurrency with Route 24 exists between exits 14A (Route 24 south) and 14B (Route 24 north). Passing the Watuppa Ponds, I-195 enters Westport, where exit 15 is a partial interchange with Sanford Road, and exit 16 marks the northern terminus of Route 88. Exits 19 and 22 provide access to local roads in Dartmouth, while, shortly after entering the port city of New Bedford, there is a full cloverleaf interchange with the Route 140 freeway (exits 24A and 24B). Exits 25 to 29 are partial interchanges with several local New Bedford city streets. A bridge over the Acushnet River takes I-195 to the town of Fairhaven, where there is the northern terminus of Route 240 freeway at exit 29. Exit 31 is for North Street in Mattapoisett, exit 35 is Route 105 in Marion, and exit 39 is Route 28 in Wareham. I-195 ends at trumpet interchange with I-495 (exit 40B) and Route 25 (exit 40A) in Wareham, having  in Massachusetts.

History

Predating I-195 were two sections of road—Fox Point Boulevard and the Washington Bridge. The Washington Bridge, crossing the Seekonk River between Providence and East Providence, was opened on September 25, 1930, replacing an 1885 swing bridge with a higher bascule bridge. A new eastbound bridge opened in November 1968.

Fox Point Boulevard, later George M. Cohan Boulevard, was a surface boulevard connecting the Washington Bridge west to the Point Street Bridge and Downtown, Providence. It was built with no cross traffic by using U-turn ramps in the median to reverse direction. This was the last part in Providence to be built as a freeway, opened in December 1968.

The first freeway section came off the west end of Cohan Boulevard and over the Providence River, ending at the one-way pair of Pine and Friendship streets, which opened in November 1958. The ramp to Pine Street has been closed, but the entrance from Friendship Street still exists. The I-95 interchange at this end opened in fall 1964; the Pine Street ramp was kept for a while.

The next section to be constructed was the part in East Providence. It opened to the last exit before the state line on December 15, 1959, and was extended into Massachusetts by August 1960.

I-195 cut through the center of Watchemoket Square, which, about 30 years earlier, was the heart of downtown East Providence but was on the decline in the 1950s. Half of the square was demolished to make way for the highway.

Before the Interstate Highway System numbering was decided upon, I-195 was planned as a relocation of US 6; in fact, all but the last section was signed as US 6 when built (the first section only eastbound though). In 1957, the number Interstate 95E (I-95E) was assigned, as all intercity routes were numbered before the auxiliary Interstate numbering was chosen, and the Providence–New Bedford, Massachusetts, route was too long to be considered intracity. The I-195 designation was assigned in 1959 with the final numbering. At some time after 1976, the definition of I-195 was extended east to I-495 (which was itself extended).

I-195 still carries US 6, now in both directions, from I-95 to the last interchange before Massachusetts. It also carries US 1A and US 44 over the Washington Bridge and its approaches, though the former has almost no signs. The Rhode Island Department of Transportation (RIDOT) started reconstructing the westbound Washington Bridge in October 2021, following years of delays.

Iway

I-195's stretch through Providence was reconstructed with a $610-million (equivalent to $ in ) project by RIDOT to relocate the I-195 and I-95 intersection. The relocation made the segment safer for traffic, reunified the Jewelry District with Downtown, and freed up more space. In the process, some 35 buildings, housing over 80 businesses and six residences, were demolished. The new stretch of highway is called the Iway by RIDOT and includes a signature bridge over the Providence River as well as a landscaped pedestrian walkway over the highway. It connects India Point Park to the Fox Point neighborhood. It involved renovating India Point Park and constructing a  pedestrian bridge; building a signature arch bridge over the Providence River; and improved highway flow, access, and safety, as the original intersection was not built for modern traffic standards. The previous lane alignment was dangerous and created congestion, as lane shifts were often required to avoid a left exit; moreover, the concrete supports had deteriorated to the point that steel shoring were needed to reinforce the intersection's many bridges. 
In the 1980s, RIDOT reviewed many plans to deal with the aging section of I-195 in Providence, which was built in the 1950s. Along with having to complete numerous repairs on one of the busiest stretches of highway in Rhode Island, traffic volumes had increased tremendously over the years. The highway, designed for 75,000 vehicles a day, carried more than 160,000 cars daily at the time. The old design also had tight curves, left-hand exits, and closely spaced exits, which had contributed to excessive congestion on I-195 and nearby streets. RIDOT worked on the Iway's environmental impact statement (EIS) in the early 1990s, finding that the existing highway deteriorated bridges, substandard roadway alignments, sharp curves, and substandard shoulder widths. The department looked at three alternatives, including a no-build option in which the existing route would be reconstructed. RIDOT ultimately chose an alignment south of the Fox Point Hurricane Barrier, which would allow safety problems and congestion issues to be addressed, while also allowing for significant redevelopment of the Providence waterfront.

The  center span of the new Providence River Bridge was built offsite at the Quonset Business Park and floated up to Providence in August 2006. The span was placed on self-propelled modular transporters, rolled onto two large barges, and floated up the bay. The opening of the Iway was preceded by a public walk on the Iway on October 20, 2007. 

On November 4, 2007, the new Iway bridge opened to eastbound traffic from I-95 north to I-195 east. The new alignment of I-195 opened in stages over the next two years. The old I-195 eastbound roadway was completely closed at the end of 2008. On June 18, 2009, the new Iway bridge opened to westbound I-195 traffic to I-95 south. By October 2009, all westbound traffic on I-195 was using the new highway; the onramps to the old I-195 were closed completely, but some of the old alignment's ramps remained open. The last major ramp of the project opened in October 2011.

Exit list
Massachusetts interchanges were to be renumbered to mileage-based numbering in a project scheduled to begin in 2016, until the project was indefinitely postponed by the Massachusetts Department of Transportation (MassDOT). On November 18, 2019, MassDOT announced the project would begin in late mid-2020. The exit numbers were changed starting on October 25, 2020, and the work was completed on November 6, 2020. Rhode Island interchanges were renumbered to a mileage-based system early in 2020 in a plan announced by RIDOT in September 2017 and scheduled to begin on January 28, 2020.

Awards 
In June 2008, RIDOT nominated the Iway bridge float for the America's Transportation Award on the basis that the project "demonstrate[d] innovative management". The Iway bridge float was one of 10 finalists for the national award, receiving an Innovative Management award in the large project category. The Publicity Club of New England also gave RIDOT its annual "Bell Ringer" award for the Iway logo.

Light pollution 
One of the key features of the Iway, the new Providence River Bridge, is illuminated by architectural lighting, making it visible from many points in the city and on the Providence River. There has been criticism that this lighting has caused a considerable amount of light pollution, which has made it difficult for astronomers in the Providence area to view the night sky. Complaints have been made to the state and in response, lights are turned off at 11:00 pm to save energy and reduce light pollution.

See also

References

External links

 RIDOT - Relocation of the I-95/I-195 Interchange
 Kurumi
 Bostonroads.com - East Providence Expressway
 Bostonroads.com - I-195 in Massachusetts
Iway videocasts - RIDOT released a series of videocasts beginning October 1, 2007, in which hosts explain stages in the project's completion

95-1 Rhode Island
1 Rhode Island
95-1
95-1
Transportation in Bristol County, Massachusetts
Transportation in Plymouth County, Massachusetts
Transportation in Providence County, Rhode Island
Transportation in Providence, Rhode Island
195